The Bangkok Challenger II is a tennis tournament held in Bangkok, Thailand since 2016. The event is part of the ATP Challenger Tour and is played on outdoor hard courts.

Past finals

Singles

Doubles

References

External links 

 ITF search

 
 
2016 establishments in Thailand
Tennis
Tennis
ATP Challenger Tour
Hard court tennis tournaments
January sporting events
Recurring sporting events established in 2016
Tennis
Tennis in Bangkok
Tennis tournaments in Thailand